Heilongjiang University of Chinese Medicine is a public medical university in Harbin, China. It was founded in 1959.

External links
Official website (Chinese)

Universities and colleges in Heilongjiang
Educational institutions established in 1959
1959 establishments in China